Kantabanji (KBJ) is a town and a notified area committee in Balangir district in the Indian state of Odisha.

History
In 1937, the railway track from Kantabanji to Vishakhapatnam was laid and since then train started running through this route. At that time no one was aware of Kantabanji. That time it was a small village under the Bangomunda police station a village near to Kantabanji. Rajendra Narayan Singh Deo who was the king of Patnagarh at that time. He was also the chief minister of Orissa from an independent party, helped extremely to explore Kantabanji and then people started living there. He was the grandfather of K.V. Singh Deo (MLA) of Patnagarh. Raj Gopala Charya helped R.N. Singh Deo to attain as the chief minister of Orissa.

The planning of this village was similar to the planning of Chandigarh or Jaipur, i.e., there is more than one way to go to the adjacent street which is a short way. Every two street is connected with more than one small street so that the person need not have to cover the full distance to go to next street. A place known as Ranipur Jharial is 23–24 km from Kantabanji which is famous for 64 Yogini Andvisnu Temples. It is beside India's second largest teakwood forest located at Mokhand. Over the past 15 years, the number of people living in Kantabanji had been changed drastically. People started giving importance to education along with business.

In 2009, Kantabanji got its first I.A.S. officer from the village and later in 2012, it got another one. Many students of this village have become engineers, doctors, Charted Accountants, officers, advocates etc. Slowly the standard of Kantabanji is increasing. The facilities of hospital and medical shops has also increased. The economy of Kantabanji is increasing. Many new routes of trains has been discovered. Kantabanji has become the center of business for nearby areas (Kantabanji).

Geography
It is almost  from its district headquarters Bolangir.

Transport
Kantabanji is an important railway station on the Vizianagaram-Raipur main line of East Coast Railway Zone. All trains passing through this line halt here for about 5–15 minutes. It is the next major station after Titlagarh.

Demographics
As of the 2001 Indian census, Kantabanji had a population of 20,090. Males constitute 52% of the population and females 48%. Kantabanji has an average literacy rate of 66%, higher than the national average of 59.5%. Male literacy is 78% and female literacy is 56%. 13% of the population of Kantabanji is under 6 years of age.

Economy
Kantabanji is located in the western part of Odisha and is a business center for the nearby villagers also it is a business hub in western Odisha. Cotton and paddy are the major crops grown and the products are sold to private buyers as well as to the government.

Kantabanji has two malls - Muskan Mall where everything is available under one roof, from grocery, clothes to entertainment everything is available at best price, and "Sai Central" which is under construction.

Politics
Kantabanji (Vidhan Sabha constituency) includes Kantabanji, Turekela block, Bangomunda block and Muribahal block. Kantabanji is part of Bolangir (Lok Sabha constituency).

The current MLA from the Kantabanji Assembly Constituency is Santosh Singh Saluja INC, who won the seat in Odisha state assembly elections 2019, Previous MLAs from this seat were Haji Mohammad Ayyub Khanof the Biju Janata Dal, who won the seat in 2009 Odisha state assembly elections. Previous MLAs from this seat were independent candidate Haji Mohammad Ayub Khan in 2004, Prasanna Pal of JD in 1990, independent candidate Chaitanya Pradhan in 1985, Prasanna Kumar Pal representing INC (I) in 1980 and representing INC in 1977.

Education
There are more than 11 schools in Katabanji.

Schools 

English medium schools

 St. Xavier's High School (Chatuanka)
 Kantabanji Lions Public School. Kantabanji Lions Sr. Secondary Public School is the leading school among all the schools in Kantabanji and has advanced teaching process. All the classrooms have projectors with the latest physical education support from (RSG). And this new generation are being taught by projectors only. They organize different seminars by the students to enhance and groom students ability to give presentation in front of public. All students are more active and almost participate in every field of competition. Many term exams are organized by the schools so that student should study and learn regularly.
 Jmj English Medium School
 Muskan International School
 Disha English Medium School - a new bloomed school providing the best kindergarten schooling facilities with a beautiful green environment with minimum cost, so that everyone can have accessibility of education to all.
 Hello Kids School. "Hello Kids School is only branded Pre-Primary School in Kantabanji with Best Facilities for all round development of Children."

Oriya medium schools

 Saraswati Sishu Vidya Mandir
 Govt. Girls High School,
 Kantabanji Nclp
 Kantabanji Rly Govt. Upper Primary School

Hindi medium schools

 Navajeevan Vidyalaya Upper Primary
 Saraswati Sishu Vidya Mandir

Colleges 

 K.V. College 
 Women's college

Among these two colleges, K.V. College has +2 science.

Tourism
 Patnagarh: The ancient capital of the kingdom of Patna is home to some ancient and unique monuments. The temples of Patneswari in Chalukyan style and that of Someswar Siva belonging to the 12th century are the monuments of prominence. One can find here the reminiscence of the earliest group of temples built during the Chauhan rule in Western part of Odisha.

Ranipur Jharial is known as "Soma Tirtha" in scriptures. It combines a section of religious faiths like Saivism, Buddhism, Vaisnavism and Tantrism. The place is famous for the Yogini temple. This temple, one among the four hypaethral temples dedicated to sixty-four Yoginis in India, is an architectural delight, the circular open vault enclosure of sixty-four yoginis being the major point of attraction. The temple of Someswar Siva is the noted one among a plethora of about 50 temples here. The majestic brick temple of Indralath is said to be the highest brick temple of Odisha. Saintala: Saintala is noted for its Chandi temple which is now in ruins. Goddess Chandi in Mahisamardini form is presently installed in a small mound. The Dasavatara (Ten incarnations) image of Lord Vishnu and broken doorjamb with figures of Ganga and Yamuna are among the remarkable places of sculpture unearthed here.

 Jogisarada: Situated at a distance of 25 km from Balangir and 7 km from Loisingha, Jogisarda is noted for the Jogeswar Shiva Temple and the temple of Goddess Lankeswari.
 Turekela: A place suitable for group camping, Turekela is important for viewing colorful wild life, like Tigers, Dear, Bears, Monkeys etc. The chirping birds perched on trees are a thrill to the searching eyes.

Hari Shankar: On the southern slope of Gandhamardhan hills, Harishankar, is a place of pilgrimage and rare scenic beauty with gurgling waterfalls. The place is also noted for the Hari Shankar temple that is unique in itself not only because of its antiquity and design with inscriptions in Porto-Oriya on the outer walls but also for being one of the rarest temples of its kind in the entire country where both Vishnu and Shiva are worshipped together. A natural spring of water appends to the beauty of Harishankar.

Charda: Situated at a distance of 4 km from Binka, it is famous for Kapilaswar Temple.

Papakshya Ghat: It is situated at a distance of 4 km from Binka. It is famous for Radhakrusna temple and Banhha Bata.

Nabagraha Kunda: It is famous for stone images of Nabagraha.

Debi Chandlipat: Situated at a distance of 11 km from Binka and is famous for its intricate tunnels.

See also
 Western Odisha
 Balangir
 Bangomunda
 Government of Odisha
 Naveen Patnaik
 Kalikesh Narayan Singh Deo
 Sangeeta Kumari Singh Deo

References

External links
 Odisha Government Website
 Odisha Tourism

Cities and towns in Bolangir district